NGC 1573 is an elliptical galaxy in the constellation of Camelopardalis. It was discovered on 1 August 1883 by Wilhelm Tempel. It was described as "very faint, small" by John Louis Emil Dreyer, the compiler of the New General Catalogue. It is located about 190 million light-years (58 megaparsecs) away.

The galaxy PGC 16052 is not a NGC object, nor is it physically associated with NGC 1573, but is often called NGC 1573A. It is an intermediate spiral galaxy with an apparent magnitude of about 14.0. In 2010, a supernova was discovered in PGC 16052 and was designated as SN 2010X.

References

Notes 

Elliptical galaxies
1573
03077
015570
Camelopardalis (constellation)